Unsounded is an ongoing epic fantasy adventure graphic novel written and illustrated by Ashley Cope, published online since 2010. Unsounded describes itself as covering "fall[ing] into the Epic Fantasy Adventure genre, with occasional forays into the horrific, the profane, and the goofy". It follows the lion-tailed daughter of a crime lord, Sette Frummagem, as accompanied by the undead soldier Duane Adelier.

Overview

Setting 
Unsounded takes place in the fictional continent of Kasslyne, which is dominated by the two superpowers Cresce and Alderode, who exist in a state of perpetual war with one another. Cresce's system of government is a mixture of Communism and Monarchy, and it exerts a large sphere of influence over most of Kasslyne. Alderode is a mysterious and insular country whose populace is divided into a supernatural caste system denoted by hair color. The castes of Alderode have wildly varying lifespans that are inversely proportional to their magical abilities. A third minor superpower, the highly corrupt and capitalist Sharteshane, influences and profits from the Cresce-Alderode war.

The Cresce-Alderode war is partly fueled by a conflict between the two dominant religions of Kasslyne: The Gefendur, who believe the world is overseen by two sets of twin gods, and the Ssaelit, who believe a man named Ssael slew the Gefendur gods and took their place. Ssaelism is heavily persecuted outside of Alderode, where it exists in an uneasy compromise with the Aldish Gefendur.

Kasslyne is governed not by the laws of physics, but by an invisible spectral plane known as "the khert". Trained individuals can use pymary (a type of magic) to manipulate the khert into altering objects' properties such as temperature, weight, and contour. The author has stated this magic system was inspired by her experiences utilizing console commands in video games. The khert also preserves the memories of all humans upon death, which can be captured and used to create artificial intelligence through a process known as "sounding". The Gefendur and Ssaelit believe that the gods reside in a deep portion of the khert known as the "Great Unsounded", so called because no sounder has ever found it.

The author deliberately eschews pinning the technology and costume design to a specific time period, stating "Unsounded cannot contain anachronisms; it doesn't take place in our world nor anywhere along its timeline." Cope has referred to the setting's aesthetic as "pymary-tech" in contrast to conventional genres such as steampunk and dieselpunk.

Plot 
Sette Frummagem, a Sharteshanian girl, is tasked by her father, the crime lord Nary-a-Care, to extort tribute from her cousin Stockyard, a black sheep of the family who has started his own business in the country of Cresce. Duane Adelier, an Aldish undead scrivener and skilled mage, is forced to accompany her as a bodyguard despite his hatred of Cresce. On their way to Cresce, the duo clashes with the Red Berry Boys, a group of criminals who disembowel kidnapped children and replace their organs with a supernatural material, and two members of the Crescian Peaceguard who mistakenly believe Duane and Sette are in league with the Red Berry Boys. Upon reaching Stockyard, he reveals Sette's father lied to her about the true nature of her mission, which involves using Duane and the Red Berry Boys to craft a superweapon that will upset the delicate balance of power between Cresce and Alderode. Sette and Duane team up with the Crescian Peaceguard and Mathis Quigley, a former employee of the Red Berry Boys, to uncover the truth behind the conspiracy and stop it before it unleashes terrible destruction upon Kasslyne.

Characters 
Unsounded uses an ensemble cast with many viewpoint characters. 
 Sette Frummagem is the daughter of the Sharteshanian crime lord Nary-a-Care Frummagem. She possesses a lion's tail, and lacks nipples, breasts, or a bellybutton. Additionally, in chapter 10, it is revealed that she does not age. Her unusual physical features and caustic personality garner scorn from others. She initially sees Duane as subhuman and subjects him to many insults and indignities, but forms a deeper bond with him after seeing his memories in the khert. She is asexual.
 Duane Adelier is an undead soldier who in life served in the Lions of Mercy, an elite contingent of the Aldish Ssaelit army. He possesses a genetic mutation that allows him to cast spells without speaking, known as "tacit casting". He was assassinated and resurrected by Bastion Winalils to test his theories on immortality, after which he was forced to flee Alderode and live in Sharteshane before being coerced by the Frummagems to accompany Sette on her journey. The Ssaelit believe that allowing a body to rot condemns it to the hells, so his undead nature causes him existential conflict. Though honorable, he is highly zealous and nationalistic, and views Crescians and Gefendur with contempt. He initially dislikes Sette, but forms a fatherly bond with her over time.
 Emil Toma née Sava is a captain of the Crescian Peaceguard, an elite group of Crescian soldiers tasked with policing the country. Together with his lieutenant Elka he investigates the Red Berry Boys and later joins forces with Sette and Duane. He struggles with the knowledge that his wife, a member of the Crescian nobility, plans to divorce him. In chapter 16 he confesses romantic feelings for Elka.
 Elka is Emil's lieutenant and a skilled spellwright. She works with Emil to investigate the Red Berry Boys, and is extremely loyal to Cresce and the Crescian queen.
 Mathis Quigley is a member of the Aldish "Platinum" caste, which grants him heightened skill with pymary at the cost of drastically shortening his lifespan. In order to amass enough money to support his son, he assists the Red Berry Boys, but defects to aid the Crescian Peaceguard when the Red Berry Boys attempt to kill him. He despises the Aldish state for murdering his wife, who planned to aid a group opposing the Aldish government.
 Mathis "Matty" Quigley, Jr. is Mathis' young son, who was blinded in the attack that killed his mother. He sees through a magical prosthetic fashioned out of a toy made by his mother. He retains an optimistic view of life despite his trauma and emotionally distant father. He has a passion for pymary, but Mathis refuses to teach him.
 Jivi Flask is a Crescian teenager who is captured by the Red Berry Boys, but escapes to join the Quigleys and, later, Duane and Sette in their quest to stop the superweapon. He forms a brotherly relationship with Matty during their travels, but resents Sette.
 Arctrit "Starfish" Ramora is the leader of the Red Berry Boys and an employee of Stockyard. He is extremely sadistic and amoral, and uses children to fuel the superweapon because it allows him to make more money, an action which sickens even hardened criminals like Stockyard. He is a pedophile and is attracted to Sette, who he molests and attempts to kidnap. He is killed in chapter 10, but his soul is absorbed by the First Silver weapon, which regurgitates him as an undead monstrosity in chapter 17.
 Anadyne "Ana" Frummagem is Sette's cousin. She was a former prostitute employed by Nary-a-Care who desired more from life and joined Stockyard's operation in exchange for learning pymary. After the First Silver monster awakens, Prakhuta fuses her with it.
 Sessine or Lady Ilganyag is a Senet beast, an immortal creature created by the Gefendur gods before the creation of Kasslyne. She is trapped in the khert, but can communicate with Duane and the Black Tongues, who she influences towards various ends.
 Ruckmearkha "Ruck" is an epheby, a Senet beast with the ability to consume memories. He is employed by the queen of Cresce to consume the soul of Roger Foi-Hellick as part of a plan to fight Alderode, but is secretly supporting a coup against the queen simultaneously. He takes Sessine's place as the "sponsor" of the Black Tongues after Sessine abandons the order.
 Prakhuta "Cutter" is an inak, a race of lizard-like humanoids historically persecuted and oppressed by humans. After experiments conducted on him by the Black Tongues, he gained the ability to work pymary, but is constantly haunted by the ghosts of bad memories. Initially a member of the Red Berry Boys, he leaves to pursue his own goals after his superweapon is completed. He is an omnicidal nihilist who seeks to destroy humanity and the bad memories stored by the khert through the use of a magical superweapon powered by pain.
 Bastion Winalils is a member of the Aldish "Jet" caste, which grants him double the lifespan of a normal human but prevents him from using pymary unless he is physically touching his target. He left home at a young age and apprenticed under Deliceu, a member of an amoral scientific community known as the Black Tongues. Deliceu subjected him to extreme physical and sexual abuse but taught him valuable knowledge in pymary and medicine, which he plans to use to "defeat death" and gift immortality to all mankind. He possesses the unique ability to teleport, but cannot carry anything with him, and must create illusory clothes using pymary. He is pansexual and frequently sexually propositions other characters.
 Lemuel Adelier is the younger brother of Duane Adelier. His experiences as a child soldier severely traumatized him and lead him to become a Ssaelit extremist in the present day.
 Maha Sonorie is the queen of Cresce. She struggles to manage the war against Alderode while weathering political attacks from General Bell, the leader of the Crescian military who seeks to overthrow her. She has multiple husbands, but only one of her spouses, Roger Foi-Hellick, is seen in the story.
 Roger Sonorie née Foi-Hellick is a member of the Aldish "Copper" caste, which grants him centuries of lifespan but prevents him from working pymary. He betrayed his upper-class family to start a failed rebellion against the Aldish state, and later entered a political marriage with the queen of Cresce. For his crimes he was branded with the "Etalarche curse", which makes all Aldish citizens experience a fierce supernatural hatred towards him. He is homosexual and was in a previous relationship with an older Copper man, who he was forced to kill in self-defense after the Etalarche curse caused them to attack one another. He willingly allows his memories to be consumed by Ruckmearkha, as he believes his soul contains a secret weakness of the Aldish government. In chapter 17, he is reduced to a vegetative state after Ruckmearkha fully consumes his soul.

Art and composition

The webcomic makes frequent use of infinite canvas techniques in its pages, such as art that expands past the borders of the page, animation, audio, and integrating the background art and site buttons into the story. Many pages also feature art that "bleeds" across panels and word balloons, giving the art a sense of depth. Characters sometimes break the fourth wall through the use of these infinite canvas techniques, such as stealing objects depicted in the website's header to use in the comic. Notable examples include the background of the website appearing to burn during pages depicting a great fire, and the alt text of site buttons being replaced with in-universe propaganda during the depiction of Roger's Etalarche curse. Additionally, some pages alter the website title to convey additional information. Border-breaking art is accomplished by dividing the webpage into multiple sections for the header, footer, and border columns in HTML, allowing the default images for those sections to be replaced with special art. Animation and audio are integrated through embedded JavaScript.

Thought bubbles are rarely shown in the comic, and only include simple images, never text. Cope instead chooses to convey character thoughts through metaphors and symbolism in the page art, encouraging readers to come up with their own interpretations of the characters' motivations and mental states. Cope considers this approach "a lot more fun" than explicit thought bubbles.

Cope draws page art together with speech balloons rather than placing speech balloons over existing art to "[Save her] from wasting time drawing stuff that's just gonna get covered by a balloon." Text is rendered using the Anime Ace 2 font.

Publication
The comic was collected in a print volume independently published by Cope in November 2012, after a Kickstarter campaign intended to raise $9,000 raised over $40,000 instead, with further Kickstarter campaigns was made for a second and third volume respectively in 2014 and 2017 each raising over $70,000 against goals of $25,000 and $50,000.

The print volumes are slightly edited to adapt the infinite canvas techniques used in the webcomic.

In addition to content originally published on the website, the print volumes contain exclusive short stories and concept art. The volumes also include small one-panel illustrations at the beginning of each chapter that are not present in the webcomic version.

Other media

Short Stories 
After the first Kickstarter campaign, Cope began writing prose stories set in the same universe as the comic. They are hosted on the same website as the comic. There are currently three stories, all of which are prequels to the comic: "Interior Emanations", a story about a teenage Duane's expulsion from seminary; "Orphans", a story about Quigley's encounter with the Black Tongues; and "Vienne of Seferpine", a story about Quigley's wife Vienne before her death.

Ask Duane & Sette 
Between November 2011 and January 2012 and again between July and September 2013, Cope would answer questions in-character as Duane or Sette on the website Formspring. After moving the webcomic to Tumblr, she again answered questions in-character on the Tumblr blog "Ask Duane & Sette" from September 2014 to February 2016. These answers are often comedic in nature, but sometimes contain additional information about the characters' backstory that can be considered "accurate" if not wholly canon.

Influences 
In a 2011 interview with Sam Sykes, Cope lists numerous artists as inspiration for her work, praising the works of Alan Moore, Sophie Campbell, and Jeff Smith and listing Hayao Miyazaki, Range Murata, and Mahiro Maeda as "some of [her] favorite artists ever". In particular, she says the novels of Herman Melville "have always driven [her]." The title of the comic is a reference to a line from Moby-Dick: "By heaven, man, we are turned round and round in this world, like yonder windlass, and Fate is the handspike. And all the time, lo! that smiling sky, and this unsounded sea!"

In addition to her literary influences, Cope also draws inspiration from her personal life. She has stated on her personal blog that the Frummagem, Winalils, and Adelier families are based on some of her own family members. However, she also believes it is important to understand one's limitations and research topics one has not personally experienced when the story calls for it. She lists the Nuremberg trials, the historical battles of World War I, and the lives of child soldiers in the Khmer Rouge as areas of research she explored in order to help her write about similar topics in the story, saying as one example, "How would I know what that was like for [child soldiers like] Lemuel otherwise, right?"

Reception
The Star-Ledger, which selected Unsounded as one of the best new and most-dynamic webcomics of 2013, approved of the comic as having "grown to be the richest comic on the Internet, and, when Cope feels like demonstrating her chops, the most artfully drawn, too", which "[w]ith its bright colors, spell effects, action sequences, and descents into dreamscapes and dens of thieves, Unsounded often feels like a Fritz Lieber story illustrated by Herge." The Daily Dot complimented how "Cope takes particular advantage of the web medium through her use of animation during impactful scenes", with E.K. Weaver noting to The Austin Chronicle its "incredibl[e] intrica[cy]" and The Beat complimenting how Cope "uses the comic’s digital nature to great advantage. Dramatic moments will sometimes pop out of the borders, magical forces will infiltrate the website design, or a joke will be animated for full effect. These tricks are used sparingly but to great effect. In many ways, this speaks to Unsounded as a whole. It can feel conventional, until it suddenly doesn’t," before concluding that "Unsounded isn’t a fantasy story about good and evil, but about different people with different goals. It has a huge supporting cast, and watching characters with competing world views bounce off each other is incredibly rewarding, especially as the plot thickens and the story increases in scale. All of these elements come together to make the comic a meaty meal that I recommend for people who really want to delve into their reading." ComicsAlliance likewise concluding "Cope [to be] fantastic at drawing action scenes, making them easier to follow visually than some superhero comics."

Some readers find Cope's heavy use of visual metaphor to be confusing, as it is not always clear which images are literal and which are not. A notable example was the scene of Vienne Quigley's death, where her torturers are metaphorically depicted as inhuman monsters. Due to the number of readers who believed the torturers' appearance to be literal, Cope chose to clarify the issue through a blog post.

References

External links

2010s webcomics
American webcomics
Fantasy webcomics
Kickstarter-funded publications
2010 webcomic debuts
Feminist webcomics